Luwang is one of the seven clans of the Meitei people. Luwang consists of several Yumnaks which are native peoples of ancient Kangleipak (now Manipur), one of the States of India.

Origin
Luwang was the son of Iputhou Pakhangba also known as Konchin Tukthapa Pakhangpa and Nula Eebemma Huimuleima. He was born inside Kangla Palace, Imphal at noon where sunlight was somewhat white in colour. He ruled some parts of Kangleipak kingdom for several years.
Luwang Punsiba was one of the great king amongst Luwang clan, during his reign Hiyang Hiren was most popular in Kangleipak.

Yumnaks of Luwang
The following are list of Yumnaks(surnames)included in the Luwangsalai.
 
 Abujam
 Achoibam
 Achoibam [angom] 
 Angambam
 Arambam
 Arekpam
 Arubam
 Asangbam [moirang] 
 Asangwangbam
 Athokcham	
 Ayekpam [mangang] [khabanganba] [leisangthem]
 Chingjabam
 Chinggaibam
 Chongtham [khabanganba] [leisangthem]
 Haorongbam [moirang] 
 Haikham
 Heikham
 Heikam
 Hijam
 Hinaosabam
 Hingkhangbam
 Huirongbam Salam
 Ichom
 Kambongmayum
 Khoibam [angom]
 Khoknam
 Khugam
 Khujammayum
 Khumukcham [khuman] [khabanganba]
 Koijam
 Kongpacham
 Laikangbam	 
 Laaikhonglembam
 Lairenjam [moirang]
 Lairongjam
 Laisom
 Lakpamsabam
 Lierongjam	 
 Lorengbam
 Loukhambam
 Loupam
 Lusangbam
 Luwangsangbam
 Mayengbam
 Maisnam/Meisnam
 Metram
 Ngoubam
 Nahakpam
 Nambam
 Naoroibam
 Naoroijam
 Ningchitpam
 Ningachikpam
 Ngangbam
 Nganglom
 Ngangom
 Nongpokpam
 Nongthombam
 Phamihanbam
 Phampibam
 Pheiroijam
 Pungkraijam
 Sakokpam
 Salam
 Sambakram
 Sambangsam
 Selam
 Senjam
 Shithangkham	
 Shithangkham [moirang]
 Soram
 Soubam
 Takhelmayum
 Thamangcham
 Thamangbam
 Thanangcham
 Thangjam [khuman] [angom] [moirang] [leisangthem]
 Thangjamsoram
 Thangjamhumukcham
 Thaoroijam
 Thaoteibam
 Thiram
 Thounaojam
 Tinbijam
 Toibijam
 Toijham
 Toumom
 Tourem [khuman]
 Urikkhinbam
 Urepkhinbam
 Usham
 Wahengbam
 Waikhom
 Wakonthem
 Wanglenbam [moirang]
 Wanglelbam [angom]
 Wanglempam
 Yangambam
 Yangkampam
 Yangkopam
 Yelangbam [khabanganba] [leisangthem]
 Yendrembam
 Yoirelkbam
 Yumlembam

See also
 Mangang
 Khuman
 Angom
 Moirang
 Kha Nganpa
 Salai Leishangthem

References

Clans of Meitei